Lensidede or Lessé Dédé, is a Surinamese village on an island in the Lawa River, near the Lensidede rapids after which the village was named. In the village live Wayana people.

History 
The Lawa River forms the border between Suriname and French Guiana, and islands are ambiguous. Both France and Suriname claimed the village. In 2021, the islands in the river were demarcated.

Notes

References 

Indigenous villages in Suriname
Populated places in Sipaliwini District
Islands of Suriname